Solarization (also pseudo-solarization or Sabattier effect) is a photographic tone reversal technique.

Solarization or solarisation may also refer to:

 Solarization (photography), a photographic effect caused by severe overexposure
 Solarization (physics), a phenomenon in physics where a material undergoes a temporary change in color after being subjected to high-energy electromagnetic radiation, such as ultraviolet light or X-rays
 Soil solarization, method for controlling pests using solar power to increase the soil temperature
 "Solarization", a song by Shorty Rogers from the 1957 album Way Up There
 "Solarisation", a song by Kenny Clarke/Francy Boland Big Band from the 1969 album Faces
 "Solarization", a song by Billy Cobham from the 1974 album Total Eclipse
 "Solarization", a song by Fredrik Thordendal from the 1997 album Sol Niger Within

See also 
 Solarize, a 2018 album by Capital Cities
 Solarized, a color scheme
 Solarized (album), a 2004 album by Ian Brown